Papilio maraho is a species of butterfly in the family Papilionidae. It is endemic to Taiwan.

Sources

See also
 List of protected species in Taiwan
 List of endemic species of Taiwan

Endemic fauna of Taiwan
Lepidoptera of Taiwan
maraho
Butterflies described in 1934
Taxonomy articles created by Polbot